Mujibur Rahman Dilu (1952 – 19 January 2021) was a Bangladeshi television and stage actor, director, theater activist and playwright. He was most notable for acting in the television drama serial Songsoptok.

Career
In 1976, Dilu directed and acted in the play Kingsuk Je Morute. It was selected in the first Drama festival of Bangladesh. He owned the theater troupe Dhaka Drama.

Dilu took part in the Liberation War of Bangladesh in 1971.

Dilu was a coordinator of Tonatuni, a children's organisation.

Personal life
Dilu was married to Rani Rahman.

Health
In June 2005, Dilu was diagnosed with Guillain–Barré syndrome. Government of Bangladesh donated Tk 1 lakh from the Prime Minister's Fund for his treatment.

Works
 Jonotar Rangoshala (an adaptation of Bertolt Brecht's The Threepenny Opera)
 Aami Gadha Bolchhi
 Nana Ronger Dinguli

References

External links

1952 births
2021 deaths
Bangladeshi theatre directors
Bangladeshi male television actors
Bangladeshi male stage actors
Date of birth missing
Place of birth missing
People with Guillain–Barré syndrome